Moana is a fungal genus in the family Halosphaeriaceae. This is a monotypic genus, containing the single species Moana turbinulata, described as new to science in 1989.

References

Microascales
Monotypic Sordariomycetes genera